S. M. Natesa Sastri (1859–1906) was a polyglot, scholar in eighteen languages and authored many books in Tamil, Sanskrit and English. His scholarliness over Tamil and Sanskrit languages got him the title "Pandit'.

Life 
Natesa Sastri was born to Mahalinga Iyer and Akhilandeswari in August, 1859 in Sangeendhi Village, Lalgudi Taluk of Tiruchirapalli District, Tamil Nadu, India. He lost his mother when he was very young and was brought up by his grandmother and step mother which he acknowledges in preface to his third volume of Folklore in Southern India (1884-1893) that contains tales recounted by them.

He studied his B.A. Degree from Kumbakonam College. He worked in Department of Arts and Sculpture Archaeology, Mysore Government for about two years. In 1888 he served as Supervisor of Udagamandalam Prisons. In the year 1900 he was transferred to Department of Documents and Registration in Arcot. Later he was posted as a Manager in the office of Inspector of Documents Registration, Madras where he served till his premature death in 1906. Pandit Natesa Sastri is one of the founder member of Triplicane Urban Cooperative Society (TUCS), founded in 1904.  Incidentally TUCS is the first Consumer Cooperative Society in India.  Life size portrait of Pandit and other founding members is in display in TUCS Head office at Triplicane, Chennai.

On April 12, 1906, while returning from Parthasarathi Temple in a lane in Triplicane, Madras a horse got violent due to sound of fire cracker and hit him with its hoof.

Literary works 
Sastri's literary works can be broadly grouped under three categories:

(1)  Translation Works - from Sanskrit classic to Tamil prose, Translation of Shakespeare English Drams and also few translations from Urdu.

(2)  Novels and Short Stories in Tamil

(3)  Collection and publication of Tamil folk tales

Translation from Sanskrit to Tamil 
Sastri  translated all the 'Kandams' (Volumes) of Indian Idhikaasam (Epic) Sri Valmiki Ramayanayam from Sanskrit to Tamil prose form.

He also wrote several Sanskrit classics in prose form. This includes Kalidasa's Kumarasambhavam, Raghuvamsam, Sudraka's Mrcchakatika, Visakhadatta's Mudrarakshasa.

Tamil literature

Tamil Novel / Puthinam 
He was one of the early novel writers in Tamil, between 1900 and 1903 he wrote six Tamil Novels.

His first novel is Deenadayalu published in 1900. Deenadayalu is the first Tamil Novel to be published under pseudonym. It also carries the credit of being the first Autobiographic novel in Tamil.

In 1902 Natesa Sastri published two novels Viz., Komalam Kumariaanatu (First Romantic Novel in Tamil) and '`Thikkatra Iru Kulanthikal.

In 1903 three novels were published namely '`Mathiketta Manivi, '`Srimami Koluvirukkail and Talaiyani Mantropatesam.

Famous Findings of Police Officer Thanavan - First Detective Stores on the line of Sherlock Holmes

Kamil Vaclav Zvelebil, a distinguished Czech Scholar in Indian Literature, Linguistics notably in Dravidian Linguistics, Literature and Philosophy commented that "Pandit Natesa Sastri was the most prolific amongst early Tamil Novelist, and his output was indeed remarkably varied. The purpose of this energetic writer who always thirsted after new experiments was, however, not so much to reform and educate as to entertain. He has to his credit over a score of books in English and over a score in Tamil: among them, there are tales from Shakespeare, South- Indian Folk Tales in Tamil and English and Six original novels published between 1900 and 1903"Ronald E Asher, Fellow of Royal Asiatic Society of Great Britain and Ireland widely acknowledged the contributions of Natesa Sastri to Tamil Novel Literature in the Second World Tamil Conference held in Chennai, India in 1968.

 Tamil short stories / translations 

 Dravida Purvankkala Kataikal (1896), Dravida Mattiyakalakkataikal (1896) 
 A Tamil Handbook on Sanitary Science  titled `Sudha Sagasra Pedigai' (1905)
 Shakespeare Dramas translated into Tamil - Twelfth Night (1892), Measure for Measure (1893)

Folklore

His most popular works were his collections of Tamil folk tales. He published a four-volume collection of Tamil folk tales titled The Folklore of Southern India (1884–88). He believed that folklore was national literature, and that it was "the most trustworthy manifestation of people's real thoughts and characteristics." Sastri's collections were based on Tamil versions of the folk tales drawn from his own memory and translated to English, and addressed to non-Indian audiences.

It was Richard Carnac Temple, a British folklorist in India who served as the President of the Folklore Society, who inspired Sastri's work and encouraged him to publish his first book on the tales. One review of the Folklore Society proclaimed that Sastri was the only Hindu member of the organisation.

Pandit Nates Sastri was very keen in emphasizing the importance of folktales. However, despite the irrefutably native credentials of folklore, it did not ultimately become an important vehicle for nationalism in Madras, having been eclipsed by the Tamil classics of the Sangam period.

 Others 

 The Dravidan Nights Entertainments (1896), this is an English Translation of Madanakamarajan Kathigal
 The King and his four Ministers (1889) an old Hindu Romance translated into English from Tamil
 Tales of Tennalirama in 1900 (the comedy cum brainy acts of the famous court jester in Vijayanagara Kingdom)
 Hindu Feasts, Fasts and Ceremonies - a brief explanation in English about Hindu festivals and ceremonies
 Indian Floktales in English
 One of the tales he published in the Indian Antiquary was translated into French by J.-H. Rosny in 1892.
 184 Indian Tales of Fun, Folly and Folklore
 Curtain Lectures (1903) is an adaptation of Douglas Jerrold's Mrs. Caudle's curtain lectures''.

References

External links 
Works by or about Natesa Sastri at Hathi Trust

1859 births
1906 deaths
Tamil writers
Indian folklorists